Daniël Noteboom (26 February 1910 – 12 January 1932) was a Dutch chess player. He gained notice at the 1930 Chess Olympiad at Hamburg, scoring 11½/15, including a win against Salo Flohr.

Chess biography
Noteboom was born in Noordwijk. He learned to play chess at the age of 12, and at 14 won a local tournament in Noordwijk. At the age of 15 he was admitted to the Leiden Chess Society, following a special dispensation from the secretary of the club – at the time chess clubs were generally reserved for adult men with social standing. In the next few years he won the championship of the club three times.

After playing at Hastings 1931/2, he soon died of pneumonia in London at age 21, ending a brief but promising chess career.

Legacy

A chess opening variation related to the Semi-Slav Defence to the Queen's Gambit is the Noteboom Variation: 1.d4 d5 2.c4 e6 3.Nc3 c6 4.Nf3 dxc4, with a common continuation being 5.a4 Bb4 6.e3 b5 7.Bd2 a5 8.axb5 Bxc3 9.Bxc3 cxb5 10.b3 Bb7.  It is also known as the Abrahams Defence after the late English master Gerald Abrahams.

References

Further reading
British Chess Magazine, 1932, p. 66, p. 125
British Chess Magazine, 1933, p. 113

External links

Chessmetrics player profile
Geschiedenis Noteboomtoernooi at www.lsg-leiden.nl 

1910 births
1932 deaths
Deaths from pneumonia in England
Dutch chess players
People from Noordwijk
Chess theoreticians
Chess Olympiad competitors
20th-century chess players